The second season of Offspring was confirmed by Network Ten on 14 September 2010 and began airing 16 May 2011. The season concluded on 20 July 2011 after 13 episodes. Offspring is the story of the impossible loves of 30-something obstetrician Nina Proudman (Asher Keddie), and her fabulously messy family, as they navigate the chaos of modern life.

The season was released on DVD as a four disc set under the title of Offspring: The Complete Second Series on 14 September 2011.

Cast

Regular
Asher Keddie as Nina Proudman
Kat Stewart as Billie Proudman
Matthew Le Nevez as Patrick Reid
Deborah Mailman as Cherie Butterfield
Eddie Perfect as Mick Holland
Richard Davies as Jimmy Proudman
Linda Cropper as Geraldine Proudman
and John Waters as Darcy Proudman

Recurring
Jane Harber as Zara Perkich
Alicia Gardiner as Kim Akerholt
Lachy Hulme as Martin Clegg
Kate Atkinson as Renee
Paul Denny as Sam Jenkins
Jay Ryan as Fraser King
Emma Griffin as Tammy
Jonny Pasvolsky as Ben Forbes
Henry and Jude Schimizzi Peart as Ray Proudman
Dan Spielman as Andrew Holland
Kate Jenkinson as Kate Reid
Tina Bursill as Marilyn Bassett

Guest starring
Andrew Rochford as Andrew Rochford
Carrie Bickmore as Carrie Bickmore
Dave Roberts as Phil D'Arabont
Alison Bell as Louise
Jane Badler as Wendy

Special guest starring
Don Hany as Chris Havel

Production
Alicia Gardiner, who plays nurse Kim Akerholt in the series, had confirmed that shooting for Series 2 began on 10 February 2011.

Episodes

Season Ratings
Australian viewers

References

2011 Australian television seasons